This is a list of topics related to Sweden.

Those interested in the subject can monitor changes to the pages by clicking on Related changes in the sidebar.

Main articles 
Sweden, a country in Europe
History of Sweden
Politics of Sweden
Geography of Sweden
Counties of Sweden
Economy of Sweden
Demographics of Sweden
Swedish language
Culture of Sweden

Lists of people 
List of Swedes
List of Swedes by net worth
List of Swedish monarchs
List of Swedish queens 
List of Swedish prime ministers
List of Swedish actors
List of Swedish architects
List of Swedish artists
List of Swedish clergymen
List of Swedish diplomats
List of Swedish entrepreneurs
List of Swedish film directors
List of Swedish military commanders
List of Swedish Field Marshals
List of Swedes in music
List of Swedish politicians
List of County Governors of Sweden
List of Swedish scientists
List of Swedes in sports
List of Swedish language writers

Administrative subdivisions

Lists
List of Swedish counties
List of municipalities of Sweden 
List of municipalities of Sweden by area  
List of municipalities of Sweden by density  
List of municipalities of Sweden by population  
List of municipalities of Sweden by wealth
List of postal codes in Sweden

Articles
Subdivisions of Sweden
Counties of Sweden
County Councils of Sweden
Municipalities of Sweden
Urban areas in Sweden

Culture

Lists
List of Swedish cultural institutions

Articles
Culture of Sweden
Music of Sweden
Rap music in Sweden
Swedish literature
Cinema of Sweden
Swedish cuisine
Holidays in Sweden
Flag flying days in Sweden
Namesdays in Sweden
National anthem of Sweden
Swedish heraldry
Coat of Arms of Sweden
Flag of Sweden
Registered partnership in Sweden
Same-sex marriage in Sweden

Demographics

Lists
List of municipalities of Sweden by density  
List of municipalities of Sweden by population

Articles
Demographics of Sweden
Swedish people

Economy, business and enterprise

Lists
List of Swedish companies
List of Swedish government enterprises
List of municipalities of Sweden by wealth

Articles
Company mortgage (Sweden)
Economy of Sweden
Swedish welfare
Unemployment benefits in Sweden
Swedish Krona
Tourism in Sweden

Education

Lists
List of universities in Sweden

Articles
Education in Sweden

Genealogy, names and nobility

Lists
List of Swedish noble families

Articles
Swedish nobility
Swedish heraldry

Geography

Lists
List of cities in Sweden 
List of rivers in Sweden 
List of islands of Sweden 
List of lakes in Sweden 
List of national parks of Sweden
Forests of Sweden

Articles
Geography of Sweden

Government and politics

Lists
List of political parties in Sweden 
List of Swedish governments
Line of succession to the Swedish throne
Swedish diplomatic missions
Sweden and the United Nations

Articles
Politics of Sweden
Foreign relations of Sweden
Monetary policy of Sweden
Swedish welfare/Social security in Sweden
Constitution of Sweden
Monarch of Sweden
Government of Sweden
Prime Minister of Sweden
Riksdag (the Parliament of Sweden)
Elections in Sweden
Referendums in Sweden
Government agencies in Sweden
Sveriges Riksbank

Healthcare

Lists
List of hospitals in Sweden

Articles
Healthcare in Sweden
Abortion in Sweden
Disability policy in Sweden

History

Lists
List of Swedish wars
List of Swedish battles
List of historic buildings in Sweden

Articles
History of Sweden
Lands of Sweden
Provinces of Sweden
Dominions of Sweden

Language

Articles
Swedish language
Standard Swedish
Finland-Swedish
Swedish alphabet
Swedish phonology
Swedish grammar
Mandatory Swedish
Rinkebysvenska
Minority languages of Sweden

Media

Lists
List of Swedish newspapers
List of Swedish magazines 
List of Swedish radio stations 
List of Swedish television channels

Articles
Media in Sweden
Communications in Sweden

Military

Lists
List of Swedish regiments
List of Swedish sail frigates  
List of Swedish ships of the line 
List of Swedish steam battleships  
List of military aircraft of Sweden

Articles
Swedish Armed Forces

Organizations and institutions

Lists
Non-governmental organizations in Sweden
SACC New York
Swedish Royal Academies

Religion

Articles
Religion in Sweden
Church of Sweden

Sport

Lists
List of football clubs in Sweden 
List of sport events in Sweden

Articles
Sport in Sweden

See also
Swedish (disambiguation)

Sweden